The Saredo Inquiry, officially known as the Royal Commission of Inquiry into Naples ( Reale Commissione d’Inchiesta per Napoli), presided by senator Giuseppe Saredo (it), president of the Italian Council of State, investigated corruption and bad governance in the city of Naples. The Commission was established in November 1900 and published its findings in October 1901.

Background
In 1899 a new Socialist newspaper, La Propaganda, began a campaign against the rampant corruption in the city of Naples. The paper's main target were the Mayor of Naples Celestino Summonte and Alberto Casale, a Liberal member of the Italian Chamber of Deputies and the local government power broker with extensive contacts in the Neapolitan underworld of the Camorra. As a result of the campaign, reform candidates such as the socialist Ettore Ciccotti and Domenico De Martino were elected in the summer of 1900 in the Vicaria, Mercato and Porto neighbourhoods, the previously unconquerable fiefdoms of Casale and his Camorra associates.

Casale, known as the "uncrowned king of Naples", accused the newspaper of slander, but in the criminal case that ensued, La Propaganda was able to prove corrupt deals and in particular a kick-back from a Belgian tram company after a horse-cab drivers' strike in August 1893 against the expansion of the tram network. The outcome of the Casale case reached the national government in Rome. Casale had to resign, the Naples city council was dissolved, and an official inquiry into the corruption in Naples was initiated.

The Inquiry 
On November 8, 1900, Prime Minister Giuseppe Saracco signed the decree establishing the Commission of Inquiry under the presidency of the senator and law professor Giuseppe Saredo, to investigate how huge amounts of money that had been poured into Naples after the cholera epidemic of 1884 had vanished without noticeable benefit for the city's poor. The inquiry unearthed an extensive political patronage system in the city of Naples, the so-called "administrative Camorra" or "high Camorra"; the corrupt class of Neapolitan executive in charge of city governments between the 1880s and 1890s brought to light by La Propaganda.

The investigations of the Inquiry took place in a difficult climate, hampered by boycotts of the administrative staff of the Municipality that contrasted with the widespread public support. The paperwork was in chaos and official files ad been lifted by staff to cover their tracks, while interviews with and testimonies of key people involved were half-hearted.

Findings
The Commission published its findings on October 21, 1901, in effect an indictment of those responsible for governing Naples. It brought to light a serious situation of corruption, cronyism, clientelism and general inefficiency. 

"I can attest that almost all the towns in the province of Naples, almost all the charitable organizations, are under the authority of criminal organisations; I add almost [so as] not to exclude the possibility of some exception," Saredo concluded. The inquiry identified a system of political patronage ran by what the report called the "high Camorra":

The Inquiry introduced the terminology of "high Camorra", with a bourgeois character, but distinct from the plebeian Camorra proper (known as the Bella Società Riformata at the time), although both were in close contact through the figure of the intermediary (faccendiere). 

However, whether the "high Camorra" was an integral part of the Camorra proper, is disputed. Although the inquiry did not prove specific collusion between the Camorra and politics, it brought to light the patronage mechanisms that fueled corruption in the municipality. The Camorra proper controlled elections by intimidation, blackmail and favouritism.

The so-called "low Camorra" or Camorra proper had established a well-organized protection racket and had the monopoly of the wholesale trade of every product entering Naples. The Commission's report had looked into the meat trade. The Camorra ran the city's slaughter-house in the suburb of Poggioreale. Peasants, shepherds and drovers were obliged to pay protection money for their animals and to hire unnecessary labourers and accept fraudulent weights. Health regulations were ignored and taxes were never paid. Superannuated meat was sold as lamb or beef for highly inflated prices.

Regulations had been systematically evaded. The Saredo Inquiry painted a desolate picture of public governance of Naples. It was the city the most urgent health problems in the kingdom. However, less than 1 per cent of the city budget was spent on sanitation and hygiene. More than twice that amount was spent in Milan and Turin, where the needs were far less urgent. Saredo concluded that among all major Italian cities, "Naples more than any other is burdened by debt, and spends the least per resident on education, health and public works."

Aftermath
A direct result of the Inquiry was a corruption trial in which twelve people were convicted, including Alberto Casale and the former Mayor of Naples. The Saredo Commission's report discredited the Liberal politicians of Naples, who were voted from office in the local elections of November 1901. However, the Rome correspondent of The Times said the Camorra had cast many votes for Socialist reform candidates at the last minute and doubted whether the new Municipal council would be able to destroy the influence of the Camorra. At the municipal election of June 1902, most Camorra-backed politicians were elected again.

The role of Il Mattino
The Neapolitan newspaper Il Mattino of Edoardo Scarfoglio, acted as the mouthpiece of mayor Summonte, Casale and their men and blasted the inquiry. Scarfoglio had close friends among the "high Camorra" politicians, which paid for his yacht with a permanent crew of eleven. The director of Il Mattino launched frenzied attacks against Saredo, who was described as an evil eye, and the inquiry was compared to a pestilential disease. The inquiry revealed that Scarfoglio had received 10,000 lire from the tramway company.

References

 Behan, Tom (2005). The Camorra: Political Criminality in Italy, London: Routledge, 
 De Grand, Alexander J. (2001). The hunchback's tailor: Giovanni Giolitti and liberal Italy from the challenge of mass politics to the rise of fascism, 1882-1922, Wesport/London: Praeger,  online edition
 Dickie, John (2011). Mafia Brotherhoods: The Rise of the Italian Mafias, London: Sceptre, 
 Snowden, Frank M. (1995) Naples in the Time of Cholera, 1884-1911, Cambridge: Cambridge University Press, 

1900 in Italy
1901 in Italy
20th century in Naples
History of the Camorra in Italy
1901 crimes in Italy